Kudoa gunterae is a  myxosporean parasite of marine fishes, first discovered in Australia from 10 pomacentrid species and 1 apogonid species.

References

Further reading
Miller, T. L., and R. D. Adlard. "Unicapsula species (Myxosporea: Trilosporidae) of Australian marine fishes, including the description of Unicapsula andersenae n. sp. in five teleost families off Queensland, Australia." Parasitology research 112.8 (2013): 2945-2957.
Griffin, Matt, et al. "Kudoa thunni from blackfin tuna (Thunnus atlanticus) harvested off the island of St. Kitts, West Indies." Journal of Parasitology 100.1 (2014): 110-116.
Heiniger, Holly, Thomas H. Cribb, and Robert D. Adlard. "Intra-specific variation of Kudoa spp.(Myxosporea: Multivalvulida) from apogonid fishes (Perciformes), including the description of two new species, K. cheilodipteri n. sp. and K. cookii n. sp., from Australian waters." Systematic parasitology 84.3 (2013): 193-215.

External links

Kudoidae
Animal parasites of fish
Veterinary parasitology
Animals described in 2009